The 2010–11 season was the 61st season in which Crawley Town played senior football, and their seventh in the Football Conference. On 1 July 2010, following a number of signings, the club held a press conference to declare their intentions for the coming season. They confirmed that the club had cleared £1,000,000 of debt and was now debt-free, and that Bruce Winfield has bought the shareholding formerly held by the Prospect Estates group. On 9 April, Crawley won the Conference National, beating Tamworth 3–0, and by doing this they will be a Football League club for the first time in their history.

Season summary
Prior to the beginning of the season, the club spent around £600,000 on players, signing the likes of Matt Tubbs from Salisbury City, Sergio Torres from Peterborough United and Richard Brodie from York City for a non-league record fee, financed in part by anonymous Far Eastern investors. The club saw success in the league losing just thrice all season before being promoted to the Football League for the first time in their history on 9 April 2011 following a 3–0 victory away to Tamworth. They finished top of the league on 105 points, a division record. The club also saw success in the FA Cup, reaching the fifth round of the competition before being eliminated by eventual Premier League champions and FA Cup semi-finalists Manchester United.

In 2017, football magazine FourFourTwo rated the Crawley Town team of the 2010–11 season the 21st most hated team of all time in British football, as a result of the club's significant financial backing and their unpopular manager Steve Evans, who was found guilty of tax evasion at his previous club Boston United. Due to the club's significant financial backing from anonymous foreign investors, they were referred to as the 'Manchester City' of non-league football. The anonymous owner was later revealed to be Hong-Kong-based Paul Hayward.

Match results 

Crawley Town results given first

Legend

Friendlies

Conference National

FA Cup

FA Trophy

Sussex Senior Cup

Player statistics 
Correct as of 23 April 2011. Players with a zero in every column only appeared as unused substitutes.

Annual awards

Crawley News Player of the Year 
Matt Tubbs

Crawley Observer Player of the Year 
Pablo Mills

Crawley Observer Young Player of the Year 
Kyle McFadzean

CTFC.net Player of the Year 
Kyle McFadzean

Transfers

In

Notes
 1 – Last played for Brighton & Hove Albion
 2 – Last played for Chesterfield
 3 – Last played for Greenock Morton
 4 – Last played for Eastbourne Borough
 5 – Last played for Stevenage Borough
 6 – Last played for Exeter City
 7 – Last played for Oxford United
 8 – Last played for Weymouth
 9 – Last played for Rotherham United
 10 – Last played for Aldershot Town
 11 – Last played for Cambridge United

Out

Notes
 1 – Next played for Gainsborough Trinity
 2 – Next played for Barrow
 3 – Next played for Droylsden
 4 – Next played for Farnborough
 5 – Next played for Southern Stars
 6 – Next played for Braintree Town
 7 – Next played for Eastbourne Borough
 8 – Next played for Ebbsfleet United
 9 – Next played for Dover Athletic

See also 
2010–11 Football Conference
2010–11 in English football

References 
General
Crawley Town F.C. Official Website
CTFC.net
BBC Sport Crawley Town site
Specific

External links 

2010–11
2010–11 Football Conference by team